The 2002 Eisenhower Trophy took place 24–27 October on the Palm and Bunga Raya courses at Saujana Golf and Country Club in Kuala Lumpur, Malaysia. It was the 23rd World Amateur Team Championship for the Eisenhower Trophy. The tournament was a 72-hole stroke play team event with 63 three-man teams. The best two scores for each round counted towards the team total. Each team was due to play two rounds on the two courses. The leading teams played on the Bunga Raya course on the third day and were due to play on the Palm course on the final day.

After heavy rain and lightning on the final morning, a cut was introduced and only the leading 20 teams played the final round. Positions 21 to 63 were determined by scores after three rounds. The leading 33 teams had played their third round on the Bunga Raya course while the others played on the Palm course.

The United States won their 12th Eisenhower Trophy, three strokes ahead of France, who took the silver medal. Australia and the Philippines tied for third place and took the bronze medals. Marcus Fraser had the best 72-hole aggregate of 281, 7 under par.

This was the first World Amateur Team Championship with teams of three; previous championships had teams of four with the best three scores for each round counting. England, Scotland, Wales, and Ireland (a combined Republic of Ireland and Northern Ireland team) competed as separate teams for the first time, whereas in previous championships a combined Great Britain and Ireland team had competed.

The 2004 Espirito Santo Trophy was played on the same courses one week prior.

Teams
63 teams contested the event. Each team had three players with exception of Russia who only had two.

The following table lists the players on the leading teams.

Results

Because of bad weather there was a cut and only the leading 20 teams played the final round.

Source:

The leading 33 teams played their third round on the Bunga Raya course with the remaining teams playing on the Palm course.

Individual leaders
There was no official recognition for the lowest individual scores.

Source:

Only players in the leading 20 teams completed four rounds. Of the players from  the remaining teams, who only completed three rounds, Benjamín Alvarado from Chile had the best score of 217, 1-over-par.

References

External links
Record Book on International Golf Federation website 

Eisenhower Trophy
Golf tournaments in Malaysia
Eisenhower Trophy
Eisenhower Trophy
Eisenhower Trophy